Savitri and Satyavan are a legendary couple in Hinduism. Savitri is a princess who marries an exiled prince named Satyavan, who is prophesied to die early. She saves her husband from the god of death, Yama, persuading the deity to restore his life.

The oldest known version of the story of Savitri and Satyavan is found in Vana Parva (The Book of the Forest) of the Mahabharata. The story occurs as a multiply-embedded narrative in the Mahabharata as told by sage Markandeya.  When Yudhishthira asks Markandeya whether there has ever been a woman whose devotion matched Draupadi's, Markandeya replies by relating this story.

Legend

The childless king of the Madra Kingdom, Ashvapati, engaged in a penance for eighteen years and offered a hundred thousand oblations to propitiate Savitri, a consort of Brahma. Pleased, the goddess Savitri appeared to him and asked him to choose a boon. Ashvapati sought the boon of having many sons to extend his dynastic line. The goddess, however, informed him that he would be blessed with a daughter instead. After some time, the king's first queen, the princess of Malava, became pregnant, and gave birth to a girl. She was named Savitri by her father, in honour of the goddess. 

Savitri grew to become a beautiful woman, brimming with such energy that she was often regarded to be a celestial maiden. No man dared to ask for her hand in marriage. On an auspicious day, after she had offered her respects, her father told her to choose a husband with suitable qualities on her own. Accompanied by ministers, she embarked on a quest on her golden chariot, visiting a number of hermitages and forests. Upon her return to Madra, Savitri found her father seated with the sage-divinity, Narada. She informed her father that she had chosen an exiled prince named Satyavan as her husband, the son of a blind king named Dyumatsena of the Shalva kingdom; Dyumatsena had been driven out of his kingdom by a foe and led a life of exile as a forest-dweller with his wife and son. Narada opined that Savitri had made a bad choice: although he was intelligent, righteous, generous, and handsome, Satyavan was destined to die one year from that day. In response to her father's pleas to choose a different husband, Savitri insisted that she had made up her mind. After Narada expressed his agreement with Savitri's decision, Ashvapati consented to his daughter's choice.

Ashvapati and Savitri approached Dyumatsena and Satyavan in the forest to propose the marriage, which was joyfully accepted. Savitri and Satyavan were soon married. Immediately after the wedding, Savitri discarded her jewellery and adopted the bark and red garment attire of a hermit, and lived in perfect obedience and respect to her new parents-in-law and husband. Despite her happiness, she could not stop dwelling on the words of Narada. Three days before the destined death of Satyavan, Savitri started to observe a vow of fasting and stood day and night. Her father-in-law worried that she had taken on too harsh a regimen, but Savitri replied that she has taken an oath to perform these austerities, to which Dyumatsena offered his support. The day of her husband's predicted demise, Savitri offered oblations to the fire and obeisance to the Brahmanas, completing her vow. She joined Satyavan when he went to chop wood. Growing fatigued due to exertion, he conveyed his desire to sleep to his wife, who placed his head on her lap. Yama, the god of death, personally arrived to collect the soul of Satyavan with his noose. Distressed, Savitri followed Yama as he carried her husband's soul away. When he tried to convince her to turn back, she offered a number of successive homilies. First, she discussed the significance of adherence to dharma, followed by association with the virtuous, the righteousness of compassion, the trustworthiness of the virtuous, and finally the conduct of the virtuous. Impressed at each homily, Yama praised both the content and diction of her words and offered to grant her any boon of her choice, except the life of Satyavan. First, Savitri asked that her father-in-law's sight be restored, and then she asked that his kingdom be returned to him. Both are granted. Next, she asked Yama that she be the mother of a hundred sons, fathered by Satyavan. Yama granted this boon partially, excluding the second component of her request. Finally, while offering a boon after hearing her next homily, he omitted the phrase "except for the life of Satyavan". Savitri instantly asked for Satyavan to be restored to life. Yama granted life to Satyavan and blessed both of them with a long life.

Satyavan stirred, regaining his consciousness, and returned to his parents along with his wife. Meanwhile, at their home, Dyumatsena regained his eyesight before Savitri and Satyavan returned. Savitri relayed the events that had occurred to her parents-in-law, husband, and the gathered ascetics. As they praised her, Dyumatsena's ministers arrived with news of the death of his usurper. Joyfully, the king and his entourage returned to Madra.

In popular culture

In Bihar, Jharkhand, and Odisha, married women observe Savitri Brata on the Amavasya (new moon) day in the month of Jyestha every year. This is performed for the well-being and long life of their husbands. A treatise entitled Savitri Brata Katha in the Odia language is read out by women while performing the puja. In Western India, the holy day is observed on the Purnima (full moon) of the month as Vat Purnima. In India, many women are named "Savitri".

It is believed that Savitri got her husband back on the first day of the Tamil month Panguni. This day is celebrated as Karadayan Nonbu in Tamil Nadu. On this day, married women and young girls wear yellow robes and pray to Hindu goddesses for long lives for their husbands. Girls start this practice at a very young age; they wear a yellow robe on this day from the time they are a year old so they will find a good husband in future.

In 1950 and 1951, Sri Aurobindo published his epic poem in blank verse titled "Savitri: A Legend and a Symbol".

In England, Gustav Holst composed a chamber opera in one act in 1916, his Opus 25, named Savitri based on this story.

The new age group 2002 released an album inspired by the story of Savitri and Satyavan in 1995.

Films and television 
There have been about thirty-four film versions of the Savitri/Satyavan story produced in India. One of the earliest is the Indian silent film, Satyavan Savitri (1914) directed by Dadasaheb Phalke. Other silent-era films include the failed Savitri (1912) by V. P. Divekar, A. P. Karandikar and Shree Nath Patankar, Sukanya Savitri (1922) by Kanjibhai Rathod, Sati Savitri (1927) by Baburao Painter, Sati Savitri (1931) by Bidkar. The 1923 version, Savitri also called Satyavan Savitri, was an Italian co-production directed by Giorgio Mannini and J. J. Madan, produced by Madan Theatres Ltd. and Cines. 

Sati Savitri (1932), a sound film, was released in Hindi/Gujarati by Chandulal Shah and was the second talkie Gujarati film. Savitri (1933) was the first film produced by the East India Film Company. Directed by C. Pullaiah, it received an Honorary Certificate at the Venice Film Festival.  Bhalji Pendharkar released Savitri (1936) in Marathi. In 1937, Savitri was produced in Hindi directed by Franz Osten. Sathyavaan Savithiri (1933), Savithri (1941) by  Y. V. Rao were also made during British rule in India.

Many films, centering on this story, were made after independence (especially in South India) and included: Telugu language film versions of the story in 1957, 1977 and 1981. Satyavan Savitri (1948), Mahasati Savitri (1955) by Ramnik Vaidya, Savitri (1961) by Phani Majumdar, Satyavan Savitri (1963) by Dinesh Rawal, Sati Savitri (1964) by Shantilal Soni, Sati Savitri (1965) by P. R. Kaundinya, Mahasati Savitri (1973) by Chandrakant, Sathyavaan Savithri (1977) by P. G. Viswambharan, Savithri (1978) by T. S. Ranga, Sati Savitri (1982) by Girish Manukant, Savitri (1983) by Murlidhar Kapdi, Maha Sati Savitri (1983) by Sona Mukherjee.

The Tamil-language films Doctor Savithri (1955) and Roja (1992) are contemporary adaptations of the story of Savitri and Satyvan.

Savitri - EK Prem Kahani, an Indian television series which aired on Life OK in 2013 is a modern adaptation of the story.

Savitri by Pavan Sadineni and Warrior Savitri (2016) by Param Gill are modern-day adaptations of the tale. The latter was controversial for its depiction of Savitri as a 21st-century woman.

Satyawaan Savitri is a 2022 big budget Marathi TV series airing on Zee Marathi based on this story.

See also
 Pativrata

References

Further reading 

 The Mahabharata vol. 2, tr. J.A.B. van Buitenen (Chicago: University of Chicago Press, 1975)
 The Savitri Brata Katha in Oriya

 Characters in the Mahabharata
Savitri and Satyavan
Characters in Hindu mythology
 Indian folklore